Lycée des Mascareignes is a private French international school in Saint Pierre, Moka, Mauritius. It serves senior high school classes (Seconde, Première, Terminale).

References

External links
 Lycée des Mascareignes

French international schools in Mauritius
Moka District